EVB Eisenbahnen und Verkehrsbetriebe Elbe-Weser GmbH is a German railway and bus company offering passenger and freight services that is headquartered in Zeven and Bremervörde. The company was created in 1981 by the merger of the two companies Wilstedt-Zeven-Tostedter Eisenbahn GmbH (founded in 1912) and Bremervörde-Osterholzer Eisenbahn GmbH (founded in 1907).

Between 1991 and 1993, the company acquired further railway lines from the Deutsche Bundesbahn and merged with the Buxtehude-Harsefelder Eisenbahn in 1993, so that the total network length reached .

The company offers a passenger rail service between Bremerhaven and Hamburg via Bremervörde that carries one million passengers per year. It also operates seventeen bus lines with four million passengers per year as well as freight services between Bremerhaven, Bremen and Hamburg. Using rented Siemens Dispolok locomotives, it also operates freight trains to Southern Germany and has recently announced to acquire two new Eurorunner diesel locomotives. During the summer months, a heritage railway service between Bremervörde and Osterholz-Scharmbeck, called the Moorexpress, is in operation.

Stations served 
The current (as of 2012) EVB passenger line leads from Bremerhaven Hbf via Bremervörde to Buxtehude.

The current stations are:
Bremerhaven Hbf (owned and operated by DB)
Bremerhaven-Wulsdorf (DB station)
Sellstedt
Wehdel
Geestenseth
Frelsdorf
Heinschenwalde
Oerel
Bremervörde (EVB depot and interchange to the Moorexpress)
Hesedorf
Kutenholz
Brest-Aspe
Bargstedt
Harsefeld
Ruschwedel
Apensen
Buxtehude (DB station, connection to Hamburg S-Bahn)

Stations beyond Buxtehude formerly served (until Dec 08, 2007):
Neu Wulmstorf (DB station)
Hamburg-Neugraben (DB station)

External links 
 Corporate home page 

 
Private railway companies of Germany